SkyWest Airlines is an American regional airline headquartered in St. George, Utah, United States. SkyWest is paid to staff, operate and maintain aircraft used on flights that are scheduled, marketed and sold by a partner mainline airline. The company is contracted by Alaska Airlines (as Alaska SkyWest), American Airlines (as American Eagle), Delta Air Lines (as Delta Connection), and United Airlines (as United Express). In all, it is the largest regional airline in North America when measured by fleet size, number of passengers carried, and number of destinations served.

SkyWest operates an average of more than 2,400 flights per day to 240 cities in the United States, Canada and Mexico with an extensive network of routes largely set up to connect passengers between smaller airports and the large hubs of its partner airlines. In total, SkyWest carried 36 million passengers in 2021.

, the company operates an average of 870 flights per day as United Express on behalf of United Airlines, 650 flights per day as Delta Connection on behalf of Delta Air Lines, 410 flights per day as American Eagle on behalf of American Airlines, and 150 flights per day as Alaska SkyWest on behalf of Alaska Airlines.

History 

Frustrated by the limited extent of existing air service, Ralph Atkin, a St. George, Utah, lawyer, purchased Dixie Airlines on April 26, 1972, to shuttle businessmen to Salt Lake City. After early struggles, SkyWest began a steady expansion across the western U.S. It became the eleventh largest regional carrier in 1984 when it acquired Sun Aire Lines of Palm Springs, California, and had its initial public offering in 1986.

In early 1986, SkyWest began codesharing as Western Express, a feeder service for Western Airlines at its Salt Lake City hub and other mainline Western destinations utilizing Embraer EMB 120 and Fairchild Swearingen Metroliner turboprop aircraft. Following the acquisition and merger of Western by Delta Air Lines in 1987, SkyWest then became a Delta Connection air carrier with code share service being flown on behalf of Delta to destinations in Arizona, California, Colorado, Montana, Nevada, Utah and Wyoming.

From 1995 through 1997, SkyWest operated codeshare service for Continental Airlines as Continental Connection on flights out of Los Angeles that were also operated as Delta Connection.

In 1997 SkyWest began operating as United Express in addition to Delta Connection on flights out of United Airlines hubs at SFO, LAX and DEN. SkyWest became United's largest United Express operation by the late 1990s. Flights were initially operated with Embraer EMB 120s and Bombardier CRJ200 regional jets. CRJ700s were added in the early 2000s and the Embraer 175 were added in 2014.

A partnership with Continental was revived in 2003 as Continental Connection out of George Bush Intercontinental Airport in Houston, but was discontinued in June 2005. This operation used Embraer EMB 120s.

On August 15, 2005, Delta sold Atlantic Southeast Airlines to the newly incorporated SkyWest, Inc., for $425 million in cash. The acquisition was completed on September 8, 2005.

In 2007 SkyWest began code sharing with Midwest Airlines at the carriers hubs in Milwaukee and Kansas City using Bombardier CRJ200 regional jets. In 2010 the code share with Midwest had ended and a new code share agreement began with AirTran Airways at Milwaukee. On September 6, 2011, AirTran Airways ended its codesharing and partnership with SkyWest. Shortly after, SkyWest began a codesharing agreement with US Airways to operate CRJ200 aircraft from US Airways' hub in Phoenix, Arizona.

On August 4, 2010, SkyWest, Inc., announced that it planned to acquire ExpressJet and merge it with SkyWest subsidiary Atlantic Southeast Airlines in a deal reported to have a value of $133 million. The purchase aligned the largest commuter operations of United Airlines and Continental Airlines, who were in a merger process, and was approved on September 13, 2010, by the Federal Trade Commission.

In May 2011, SkyWest replaced Horizon Air on six routes on the West Coast being operated for Alaska Airlines. The flights were based out of Seattle and Portland, and fly to several California cities including Fresno, Burbank, Santa Barbara and Ontario. Horizon Air had been operating these routes with Bombardier CRJ700 aircraft however Horizon retired this aircraft from its fleet. Alaska Airlines had a similar agreement with PenAir for Alaskan flights and Horizon Air for flights in the lower 48.

On November 15, 2012, SkyWest began a capacity purchase agreement with American Airlines for 12 Bombardier CRJ200 aircraft operating as American Eagle from American's hub in Los Angeles, California. This code share agreement with American was greatly expanded over the next several years to include destinations from American's hubs at Chicago, Dallas/Fort Worth, and Phoenix. Larger CRJ700/900 aircraft were introduced to the American Eagle system in 2016 and the smaller CRJ200s were discontinued in 2020. Embraer 175 aircraft joined the American Eagle system in late 2021.

On September 6, 2017, SkyWest Airlines reported that it has entered into aircraft purchase agreements and capacity purchase agreements to acquire and fly 15 new aircraft with Delta Air Lines and 10 new aircraft with Alaska Airlines. Of the 25 aircraft, 15 Embraer 175SC aircraft will fly under an agreement with Delta in a 70-seat configuration. The E175SC aircraft is built on the same airframe as other E175 aircraft and can be retrofitted to 76 seats in the future. The agreement with Alaska includes 10 Embraer 175 aircraft which will be configured with 76 seats, similar to aircraft SkyWest has previously placed into service with Alaska.  Expected delivery dates of the 25 aircraft run from March 2018 through the end of 2018.

On December 18, 2018, SkyWest, Inc., announced that it would sell ExpressJet Airlines to another airline holding company with ties to United Airlines, ExpressJet's sole client. The $70 million sale closed on January 23, 2019.

Corporate affairs

Ownership and structure 
SkyWest is owned by SkyWest, Inc., an airline holding company. SkyWest also provides contract ground handling services at airports across the United States.

Business model 
The vast majority of SkyWest's contracts are fixed-fee, with partner airlines paying a set amount for each flight operated, regardless of the number of passengers carried. The remaining 7% of flights are operated under a pro-rate contract, with SkyWest assuming all costs, setting fares, retaining all revenue from non-connecting passengers, and splitting the fares of connecting passengers on a pro-rated basis with the partner airline. SkyWest currently operates on a pro-rate basis on 68 routes across 10 hubs through agreements with American Airlines, Delta Air Lines, and United Airlines.

As of early 2021, SkyWest operates to 50 smaller cities that are subsidized under the federal governments' Essential Air Service program. 36 are served under the United Express brand and 14 under the Delta Connection brand. Service to four other airports in Wyoming are subsidized by the state of Wyoming and operate under the United Express brand. All subsidized routes are flown with Bombardier CRJ200 regional jets.

Business trends 
Performance figures for SkyWest Airlines are fully incorporated into the accounts of its parent company, SkyWest, Inc.

Figures that are available for SkyWest Airlines alone (referred to as 'SkyWest Airlines segment' data in the Group accounts), are shown below (as at year ending December 31):

Operations 

Hubs
Chicago–O'Hare (American, United)
Denver (United)
Detroit (Delta)
Houston–Intercontinental (United)
Los Angeles (Alaska, American, Delta, United)
Minneapolis/St. Paul (Delta)
Phoenix–Sky Harbor (American)
Portland (OR) (Alaska)
Salt Lake City (Delta)
San Francisco (United)
Seattle/Tacoma (Alaska, Delta)

Crew Bases
Atlanta
Boise
Chicago–O'Hare
Colorado Springs
Dallas/Fort Worth
Denver
Detroit
Fresno
Houston–Intercontinental
Los Angeles
Minneapolis/St. Paul
Palm Springs
Phoenix–Sky Harbor
Portland (OR)
Salt Lake City
San Diego
San Francisco
Seattle/Tacoma
Tucson

Maintenance Bases
Boise
Chicago–O'Hare
Colorado Springs
Detroit
Fort Wayne
Fresno
Milwaukee
Nashville
Oklahoma City
Palm Springs
Salt Lake City
South Bend
Tucson

Destinations 

, SkyWest flies to 250 destinations throughout North America across 47 states, 5 Canadian provinces and 10 Mexican cities.

Fleet

Current fleet 
SkyWest has the largest fleet of any regional airline in the United States. Since 2015, the airline has exclusively operated jet aircraft. Most Skywest aircraft are painted in the livery of partner carriers, but SkyWest does have a small number of aircraft in its own livery that can be operated for any partner airline as needed.

SkyWest is a major operator of the CRJ family of regional jets, and is the largest operator of the Bombardier CRJ200 and took delivery of the last CRJ ever built, a CRJ 900.

Like most regional airlines in the United States, SkyWest is subject to scope clause requirements of its mainline carrier partners and their pilot unions; those requirements limit the size of the aircraft flown by a regional airline, measured in seat capacity. This has created three subgroups of aircraft flown by SkyWest: aircraft with no more than 50 seats, no more than 70 seats, and no more than 76 seats.

, the SkyWest Airlines fleet consists of the following aircraft, categorized by seating capacity:

Note: the above chart only shows aircraft in scheduled service. It does not include aircraft that are: owned by SkyWest but leased to other operators, removed from service, transitioning between agreements with partners, used as spares, parked, or in the process of being parted out.

Historical fleet 
SkyWest previously operated Embraer EMB 120 turboprop aircraft until 2015.  The airline also operated Fairchild Swearingen Metroliner turboprops (Metro II and Metro III models).  In 1984, SkyWest was operating the largest Metro propjet fleet in the world with 26 aircraft, and by 1991 the Metro fleet had grown to 35 aircraft with 15 Brasilia propjets also being operated.  By 1994, the first jet, a Bombardier CRJ-100, was added to the fleet and by 1996 all of the Metro propjets had been retired as they were progressively replaced with Brasilia aircraft.

According to the airline's website, at its inception SkyWest was operating all flights in the early 1970s with small propeller-driven, piston-engine aircraft, including:

 Piper Cherokee 140 – two passenger seats
 Piper Cherokee Arrow – four passenger seats
 Piper Cherokee Six – six passenger seats
 Piper Navajo – eight passenger seats
 Piper Navajo Chieftain – nine passenger seats

Accidents and incidents 
Incidents include:
 January 15, 1987: SkyWest Airlines Flight 1834, a Fairchild Metroliner, collided with a Mooney M20 transporting an instructor and a student, while on a flight between Pocatello, Idaho, to Salt Lake City, in the vicinity of Kearns, Utah. All ten aboard both planes, eight on Flight 1834 and two in the Mooney, were killed. The accident was found to be a navigation error of the student pilot aboard the Mooney.
 January 15, 1990: SkyWest Airlines Flight 5855, a Fairchild Metroliner, collided with terrain during an instrument approach to Elko, Nevada.  There were four serious and nine minor injuries.
 February 1, 1991: SkyWest Airlines Flight 5569, a Fairchild Metroliner, was awaiting departure clearance on an active runway at LAX for a scheduled flight to Palmdale when USAir Flight 1493, a Boeing 737-300 arriving from Columbus, Ohio, collided with it while it was landing. Skywest 5569 was directed to position and hold on runway 24L at the intersection of taxiway 45. US1493 was cleared to land on 24L one minute later by the same local controller. One minute later, the 737 touched down, then landed on the SkyWest Metro, which was still holding in position  from the runway threshold. The two planes slid down the runway, then off to the side, coming to rest against an unoccupied firehouse, and burst into flames. All twelve on the Metroliner were killed (ten passengers and two pilots), and 22 of the 89 aboard the 737 perished (20 passengers, 1 pilot, and 1 flight attendant). The cause was found to be air traffic controller error.
 May 21, 1997: SkyWest Airlines Flight 5724, an Embraer EMB 120, N198SW, experienced a total loss of engine power to the right engine and associated engine fire, followed by a total loss of all airplane hydraulic systems, after takeoff from San Diego International Airport, California. The airplane sustained substantial damage. The 2 pilots, 1 flight attendant, and 14 passengers were not injured. Skywest Airlines was operating the airplane as a scheduled domestic passenger flight under 14 CFR Part 121. The flight was destined for Los Angeles, California. It diverted to Miramar NAS, San Diego, where it landed at 14:27 local time. Visual meteorological conditions prevailed at the time, and an IFR flight plan was filed.
May 26, 2007: SkyWest Airlines Flight 5741, an Embraer EMB 120, was involved in a serious runway incursion when the plane nearly collided with Republic Airways Flight 4912, an Embraer 170, on intersecting runways at San Francisco International Airport. There were no reported injuries to passengers and no reported damage to either aircraft.
January 13, 2008: A United Airlines Boeing 757-200 jet with maintenance workers on board at San Francisco International Airport backed into SkyWest Airlines Flight 6398, a Bombardier CRJ700 carrying 60 passengers and crew. The collision occurred at 7:30 p.m. as the 757 was being taken out of service and being moved without passengers from Gate 80 to a hangar for the night. The passengers on board the SkyWest plane were taken off the plane, which had left its gate and was waiting to depart to Boise, Idaho. Both planes suffered tail and engine damage, but no one on board either plane was injured.
September 7, 2008: SkyWest Airlines Flight 6430, a Bombardier CRJ700 operating as a United Express flight from Los Angeles, California, ran off a runway after landing in San Antonio, Texas. An airport spokesman indicated that the aircraft appeared to be having mechanical difficulties, and resulted in the airport's primary runway being closed for two hours until the aircraft could be removed. No injuries were reported among the 52 passengers and 4 crew members on board.
May 23, 2010: SkyWest Airlines flight 6467, a Bombardier CRJ200 operating as a United Express flight from San Francisco, California, landed in Ontario, California, with the nose gear retracted. No injuries were reported among the 24 passengers and 3 crew aboard.
July 17, 2012: An out-of-service SkyWest Bombardier CRJ200 operating for Delta Connection was stolen by a SkyWest pilot on administrative leave, after murdering his girlfriend several days earlier, and substantially damaged at the St. George Regional Airport in St. George, Utah. The pilot started the engines and taxied the aircraft into a parking lot, striking the terminal and damaging several parked cars in the process. He would die from a self-inflicted gunshot wound. The aircraft was out of service and there were no other passengers or crew on board.
May 11, 2015: SkyWest Airlines Flight 5316, a Bombardier CRJ200 operating as a United Express flight from Monterey, California, to Los Angeles, California, landed after its landing gear failed to fully deploy. The left wing scraped the runway. All 40 passengers and three crew members safely deplaned and no injuries were reported.
December 4, 2016: SkyWest Airlines Flight 5588, an Embraer 175 operating as a United Express flight from Houston's George Bush Intercontinental Airport to Monterrey, Mexico, was diverted to San Antonio after experiencing an abnormal landing gear indication. Upon landing, the nose gear of the aircraft collapsed, and the aircraft came to rest on the runway. Of the 51 passengers and 4 crew members aboard, only 1 minor injury was sustained during the evacuation. During recovery of the aircraft, it was discovered that a failed downlock spring on the nose gear had prevented the landing gear from locking in the down position.

See also 

 Air transportation in the United States

References

External links 

SkyWest Airlines
SkyWest Inc.
SkyWest Airlines fleet (archived 24 October 2015)

Regional Airline Association members
Airlines based in Utah
St. George, Utah
Airlines established in 1972
Regional airlines of the United States
1972 establishments in Utah
Oneworld affiliate members